The 1931–32 British Ice Hockey season consisted of English League and a Scottish League.

English League
The league in England was won by Oxford University.

Scottish League
Nine teams participated in the league, and the Glasgow Mohawks won the championship and received the Canada Cup.

Scores

Table

Mitchell Trophy

Results

References 

British